Slavčo Georgievski (born 30 March 1980 in Skopje, SR Macedonia, SFRY) is a retired footballer from Macedonia, who last played for Inter Baku as a midfielder and currently manager for FK Skopje.

Career

Club
Georgievski started his career in FK Vardar. After that he played for FK Makedonija GP, Romanian club CFR Cluj, FK Sloga, FK Cementarnica 55 Skopje and Bulgarian club Vihren. He signed with Slavia in June 2007 for a fee of 50 000 €. In the winter of 2008 he was loaned out for six months to Chinese club Zhejiang Lücheng. In June 2008 Georgievski returned to Slavia. In February 2009, he completed to move to K-League side Ulsan Hyundai. He scored his first goal for Ulsan Hyundai at match against FC Seoul. He joined Ethnikos Achnas in January 2010.  He signed with Neftchi Baku on 9 June 2010.

International
He made his senior debut for Macedonia in a September 2003 European Championship qualification match away against Slovakia and has earned a total of 22 caps, scoring no goals. His final international was an August 2011 friendly match against Azerbaijan.

Career statistics

Club

International

Statistics accurate as of match played 7 October 2010

Honours
FK Vardar
Macedonian First League (2): 2001–02, 2002–03
Neftchi Baku
Azerbaijan League (2): 2010–11, 2011–12

References

External links
Profile at MacedonianFootball.com 
Football Federation of Macedonia Website 

Profile at kleaguei.com 

1980 births
Living people
Footballers from Skopje
Association football midfielders
Macedonian footballers
North Macedonia international footballers
FK Vardar players
FK Makedonija Gjorče Petrov players
CFR Cluj players
FK Sloga Jugomagnat players
FK Cementarnica 55 players
OFC Vihren Sandanski players
PFC Slavia Sofia players
Zhejiang Professional F.C. players
Ulsan Hyundai FC players
Ethnikos Achna FC players
Neftçi PFK players
Shamakhi FK players
Macedonian First Football League players
Liga I players
First Professional Football League (Bulgaria) players
Chinese Super League players
K League 1 players
Cypriot First Division players
Azerbaijan Premier League players
Macedonian expatriate footballers
Expatriate footballers in Romania
Macedonian expatriate sportspeople in Romania
Expatriate footballers in Bulgaria
Macedonian expatriate sportspeople in Bulgaria
Expatriate footballers in South Korea
Macedonian expatriate sportspeople in South Korea
Expatriate footballers in China
Macedonian expatriate sportspeople in China
Expatriate footballers in Cyprus
Macedonian expatriate sportspeople in Cyprus
Expatriate footballers in Azerbaijan
Macedonian expatriate sportspeople in Azerbaijan